Live Kreation is a two-disc live album by German thrash metal band Kreator. Released in 2003 by Steamhammer Records it contains 24 tracks recorded at various points during the band's extensive 2001/2002 tour. A limited edition digibook was also released featuring exclusive 36 pages deluxe color booklet with liner notes by Paul Stenning. It was also released as limited boxset containing this 2CD, a poster and the DVD Live Kreation: Revisioned Glory.

Track listing

Disc 1
 "The Patriarch" – 1:08
 "Violent Revolution" – 5:06
 "Reconquering the Throne" – 4:50
 "Extreme Aggression" – 4:09
 "People of the Lie" – 3:16
 "All of the Same Blood (Unity)" – 5:53
 "Phobia" – 3:26
 "Pleasure to Kill" – 2:48
 "Renewal" – 3:59
 "Servant in Heaven – King in Hell" – 5:08
 "Black Sunrise" – 4:41
 "Terrible Certainty" – 4:45
 "Riot of Violence" – 5:46

Disc 2 
 "Lost" – 3:50
 "Coma of Souls" – 5:02
 "Second Awakening" – 4:50
 "Terror Zone" – 6:11
 "Betrayer" – 4:50
 "Leave This World Behind" – 3:27
 "Under the Guillotine" – 4:48
 "Awakening of the Gods" – 3:17
 "Golden Age" – 4:38
 "Flag of Hate" – 3:22
 "Tormentor" – 3:55

Credits 

Mille Petrozza – vocals, rhythm guitar, production, concept
Sami Yli-Sirniö – lead guitar
Christian Giesler – bass
Jürgen "Ventor" Reil – drums, vocals in 'Riot of Violence'
Pit Bender – engineering
Jamie Cavenagh – drums
Peter Csodanczi – guitars
Howard Davis – drums
Schlanky Jörg "Schrörg" Düsedau – tour management
Jason Engel – tour management
Andy Ernst – merchandising
Chris Gräf – lighting
Andreas Marschall – cover painting
Paul Stenning – liner notes
Martino Müller – lighting
Derek Murphy – engineering
Phil Rasmussen – guitars
Brain S. Reilly – engineering
Uwe Sabirowsky – engineering
Jörg Sahm – lighting
Dirk Schelpmeier – art direction, design
Andy Sneap – mixing
Marc Vanvoorden – drums
Ulrich Weitz – drums
Scott Wilson – merchandising
Jörg Zaske – tour management

References

Kreator albums
2003 live albums
SPV/Steamhammer live albums
Live thrash metal albums

pl:Endless Pain